To fail is not to meet a desirable or intended objective.
Fail may also refer to:

Places
 Lia Fáil, the coronation stone for the kings of Ireland, and source of the Inis Fáil name for Ireland
 Fail, Viseu, a parish in Portugal
 Fail Monastery, in Scotland
 Fail Loch, a former lake near the monastery

People
 James M. Fail (1926–2010), American financial executive
 Noël du Fail, (1520–1591), Breton jurist and writer

Other uses
 "Fail", a song on Depeche Mode's 2017 album Spirit

See also 
 Fianna Fáil, an Irish political party
 Fayl, a village in eastern Yemen
 Fale (disambiguation)
 Failure (disambiguation)
 Failer, 2003 album by Kathleen Edwards